Robert Ibbitson (fl. 1648–1654) was a 17th-century publisher in London.

Publications

17th-century English businesspeople
Publishers (people) from London
Year of birth unknown
Year of death unknown